The Secular Miracle: Religion, Politics, and Economic Policy in Iran is a 1990 book by Ali Rahnema and Farhad Nomani  in which the authors argue that the radical views of Islamic leaders of Iranian Revolution were modified/secularized during the first years of Islamic government.

Reception
The book has received positive reviews in Iranian Studies and International Journal of Middle East Studies.

References

External links 
The Secular Miracle: Religion, Politics, and Economic Policy in Iran

1990 non-fiction books
English-language books
Books about politics of Iran
History books about Iran
Books about the Iranian Revolution
Secularism in Iran
Islam and secularism
Zed Books books